Peyman Soltani (Peymân Soltâni; born 17 January 1971 in Iran) is a Persian composer, orchestra conductor, instrumentalist and critic. He is currently living in Tehran.

Life
He started learning music and painting in workshops of national TV and Radio of Iran and also in the free classes offered by the Ministry of Culture and Arts in 1977. He began his primary education in Aryamehr School in Kerman in 1979. At 16 years of age, he came to Tehran to study graphics. Then he went to Armenia to continue his graduate studies in music composition. Music has always been the pillar of his life. He started playing musical instruments in a self-taught manner, then, continued played under the supervision of some famous Iranian masters such as Emmanuel Melik Aslānian, Farāmarz Pāyvar, Dr. Mohammad Taghi Massoudieh and Farhad Fakhreddini as well as some European and Armenian professors like Thomas Christian David and Yuri Davytyān. As far as philosophy and aesthetics are concerned he has benefited from Dr. Reza Baraheni and Dr. Manuchehr Badiei.
Ever since his youth, besides learning music, he has been also teaching music playing, composing basics, form and analysis, and understanding the 20th century and the nations' music. He has been art director of several publications, such as Vistar, Agra, Sorna, Daricheh and Jamedaran publications and the music editor of the music and poetry desks in some literary periodicals such as Baya, Ghal o maghal, and the editor-in-chief of Changi music journal and Sorna music quarterly since 1994.
In the early 90s, he organized two music ensembles: Shabānroud, with his students, and Shenidastān, with the young instrumentalists. He also established Aghaz Music Society in 1995. Since 1989 he has performed many concerts alone or with various ensembles. Soltani became the manager of the first Audio Music House of Iran in 1998, which due to some changes in the management of the municipality, was closed down permanently after a year and a half. He then founded the museum of Avaha & Navaha in Shiraz in 2004 and served as its manager for 3 years. He is currently the conductor of Iranian Melal (Nations) Symphony Orchestra, music director of ICOM in Iran, in charge of the International Department of the Iranian Music Museum and the Director of Online Music Museum and Women of Music websites as well.

Peyman Soltani, in his former philosophical and critical writing, was a follower of analytical philosophy (Existentialists). In the musical sphere, at the beginning of his musical works, he was a follower of (modernist and postmodernist) composers associated with the Darmstadt school, but recently he is seeking an identity in his works. His other activities include publishing poetry, criticism and graphic designs.

Works 
 Iraneh Khānom
 Khayyāmi Digar
 Arash Kamāngir
 Azādi (Freedom)
 Raghse Sharghi (Eastern Dance)
 Zanāneye Pārsi
 Yādegāre Leyli
 Doore sharghi
 Bakhtiāri Rhapsody
 Nesyān(Amnesia)
 Golkoo
 Khosravāni

See also
Persian Symphonic Music

External links
Nations Orchestra and Oil Symphony (BBC Persian)
3000 Year Old Piece to be Performed at Persepolis
Melal Orchestra
The Melal Ensemble Concert

1970 births
Living people
21st-century Iranian musicians
People from Kerman Province
Barbad award winners